Starpoint Central District is a public schooling system consisting of elementary, intermediate, middle, and high school institutions. The district also offers Universal Pre-Kindergarten through funding from the New York State Education Department.  It is located in Pendleton, New York. The district mascot is the Spartan, and the school colors are garnet and gray, and red. Boys hockey. Girls include basketball, cheerleading, cross country, field hockey, soccer, softball, swimming and diving, tennis, track and field, and volleyball.

In 2017 Starpoint CSD was ranked 6th out of 98 school districts according to Business First.  They also received a Five Star Science Award for exceptional performance in ELA, Math, Science, and Social Studies across grades K-12 in 2013.

Schools
 Starpoint High School (Built in 2003)
 Starpoint Middle School 
 Douglas J. Regan Intermediate School 
 Fricano Primary School (Built in 1965)

Notable alumni
Timothy Mcveigh, Oklahoma City bomber and later died by lethal injection on June 11, 2001, by the federal law.
Matt Cross, a professional baseball player for the Oakland Athletics.</ref>
Zachary Ahart, 2013 Mid-American Conference Men's Cross Country Champion, Winner of 119th annual Buffalo YMCA Turkey Trot.
Tom McCollum, a professional ice hockey player.

References

External links

School districts in New York (state)
Education in Niagara County, New York